Montréal-Ouest station is a commuter rail station in the Montreal borough of Notre-Dame-de-Grâce, adjacent to the border with the town of Montreal West, Quebec. It serves the Exo Vaudreuil-Hudson, Saint-Jérôme, and Candiac lines. Montréal-Ouest station is located in ARTM fare zone A, and has 20 parking spaces. It is the station where these three lines come together as one towards Lucien-L'Allier station.

Origin of name
Montréal-Ouest takes its name from the Town of Montreal West, which this station serves. The Town's main street, Westminster Avenue, crosses the tracks directly to the west of the station building.

History

The station opened on 14 April 1889, when the Canadian Pacific Railway's Windsor Station and its approach tracks came into service. Its original name was Montreal Junction, the second place to bear this name, because it was (as it still is today) the place where numerous CPR passenger lines came together near the Montreal terminal. The present Montreal-West station was built in 1905.

Until about the 1970s there were 4 tracks at the station.  Track 1 (the southernmost track, closest to the station) was removed.  In the 1980s the crossover from North Junction into the station (track 4) was removed, but was restored in 1999 when the Blainville train line (now Saint-Jérôme line) started downtown service.  It was not until 2003, however, that Saint-Jérôme trains stopped at Montréal-Ouest. At that point, the northernmost track (now signed as Track 3) was served by an island platform, which also served track 2.

In 2019, however, another side platform was built north of the station, with the northern face of the island platform fenced off. For now, access to this platform from the rest of the station is only via the Avenue Elmhurst level crossing, with additional accesses from the Elmhurst bus loop and Rue Sherbrooke. In the Summer of 2023, the tunnel which connects the station building with the island platform will be extended to Platform 3 and the northern accesses.

Along with Beaconsfield station, this is the only station on the line to retain its original station building (1889) in passenger use. In addition to ticketing facilities, the station building houses an underpass that connects to two headhouses on the island platform. Mechanical bells are still sounded as a signal when trains approach this station.

Prior to the reform of the ARTM's fare structure in July 2022, this station was in zone 1.

Train services

Current
 Vaudreuil–Hudson line: (1889–1982 by CP, 1982–1996 by the STCUM, 1996–2017 by the Agence Métropolitaine de Transport (AMT), 2017–present, by Exo)
 Saint-Jérôme line: (1951–1980 by CP, 1999–2017 by the AMT, 2017–present, by Exo)
 Candiac line: (1889–1980 by CP, 2001–2017 by the AMT, 2017–present, by Exo)

Former
 Boston (The Alouette/The Red Wing: 1926–1959)
 Canadian train to Chicago: (1914–1940)
 Canadian train to Vancouver: (1955–1979)
 The Atlantic Limited: (1955-1979)
 The Adirondack: (1974–1986)

Most trains on these lines ran from Place Viger until it closed on 31 May 1951. They served Montreal-West only when their terminal was Windsor Station—a few trains until June 1951, all of them thereafter.
 Quebec City (via Trois-Rivières): (1951–1984)
 Ottawa via Montebello: (1951–1981)
 Mont-Laurier: (1951–1981)

Bus connections

Société de transport de Montréal (STM)

See also 
 The Adirondack, The last intercity train to use this station

References

External links
 Official Website, Vaudreuil-Hudson Line
 Official Website, Saint-Jerome Line
 Official Website, Candiac Line
 Combined schedule of trains at Montreal West
 2016 STM System Map

Exo commuter rail stations
Canadian Pacific Railway stations in Quebec
Railway stations in Canada opened in 1905
Railway stations in Montreal
Montreal West, Quebec
Former Amtrak stations in Canada
Former Delaware and Hudson Railway stations